The World Is a Thorn (also stylized The World Is Λ Thorn) is Demon Hunter's fifth studio album, which was released March 9, 2010. The album is described by the band as their "heaviest but most melodic" album yet. The first single, "Collapsing", which features Björn "Speed" Strid of Soilwork, and the title track were approved for sales on Rock Band's Rock Band Network. It is the only album to feature rhythm guitarist Ryan Helm.

Track listing

"Collapsing", "Driving Nails", "Blood In the Tears" and "LifeWar" were released as singles for the album.

Chart performance
The album debuted at No. 39 on the Billboard 200 with first-week sales of 14,000.

Weekly charts

Year-end charts

Awards

The album was nominated for a Dove Award for Rock Album of the Year, while its deluxe version was nominated for Recorded Music Packaging of the Year at the 42nd GMA Dove Awards.

Credits 

Members
Ryan Clark – lead vocals
Patrick Judge – lead & rhythm guitar, backing vocals
Ryan Helm –   rhythm &   lead guitar
Jon Dunn – bass guitar
Timothy "Yogi" Watts – drums

Production
 Aaron Sprinkle – producer
 Jason Suecof – mixing
 Dan Seagrave – artwork
Chris Carmichael — strings

References

External links
 Solid State Album Listing

2010 albums
Demon Hunter albums
Solid State Records albums
Albums produced by Aaron Sprinkle
Albums with cover art by Dan Seagrave